John Catesby was a British judge.

John Catesby may also refer to:

 John Catesby (MP for Warwickshire) (died 1405), MP for Warwickshire
 John Catesby (MP for Northamptonshire), MP for Northamptonshire (UK Parliament constituency) in 1425 and 1429